Keles may refer to:

Geography
 Keles, a town in Bursa Province, Turkey
 Keles (river), in Kazakhstan and Uzbekistan
 Keles, Uzbekistan, a town in Tashkent Province

People
 Keleş, a list of people with the Turkish surname Keleş or Keles